Tech 21 is a New York based manufacturer of guitar and bass effect pedals, amps, and DI boxes which allow the user to emulate the tone of many popular guitar amps and record those sounds directly into a mixer.

Products

Tech 21's core product, the SansAmp, was designed by Andrew Barta and introduced in 1989. The SansAmp got popular in the 1990s. Later, SansAmp became an entire line of products for various instruments and applications.

Tech 21 offerings include the Fly Rig Series, artist signature gear for Geddy Lee, Richie Kotzen, Paul Landers, dUg Pinnick, and Steve Harris. Other products have included distortion pedals as well as a range of amplifiers that use SansAmp technology built in. 

While being the precursor to digital amp modeling technology, Tech 21 relies on analog technology, rather than digital signal processing.

References

External links
 Tech 21 website
 SOS interview with Andrew Barta
NAMM Oral History Interview with Andrew Barta, founder January 14, 2009
NAMM Oral History Interview with Dale Krevens, V.P. January 25, 2015
Guitar amplifier manufacturers
Guitar effects manufacturing companies
Manufacturing companies based in New York City
Audio equipment manufacturers of the United States